Sugarbowl-Grizzly Den Provincial Park and Protected Area is a provincial park in British Columbia, Canada.

History
The park was established in 2000. In 1973 and 1974, Northwood Pulp and Timber Ltd. built the original trails and cabins (Raven Lake and Grizzly Den). The Ministry of Forests maintained the trails and cabins up until 2000.

Geography
The park is 24,765 hectares in size. The Grand Canyon of the Fraser represents a unique feature which has historic significance related to the "Overlanders" journey to the Cariboo gold field in the 1860s and the construction of the Grand Trunk Pacific Railway.

The park is located 95 kilometres southeast of Prince George, British Columbia.

Conservation
The park is a refuge for caribou and grizzly bears.

Recreation

The following recreational activities are available: backcountry camping and hiking, cross-country skiing, snowshoeing, fishing and hunting. There are three cabins available in both summer and winter for the public's overnight use: 8 Mile log cabin; Raven Lake cabin and Grizzly Den cabin.

See also
List of British Columbia Provincial Parks
List of Canadian provincial parks

References
Nash, Mike. Exploring Prince George: A Guide to North Central B.C. Outdoors. Rocky Mountain Books, c2004. .

External links

Sugarbowl-Grizzly Den Provincial Park and Protected Area at BC Parks
Prince George Backcountry Recreation Society

Regional District of Fraser-Fort George
Provincial parks of British Columbia
Protected areas established in 2000
2000 establishments in British Columbia